Gorytvesica sachatamiae is a species of moth of the family Tortricidae. It is found in Pichincha Province, Ecuador.

The wingspan is 13.5-14.5 mm for males and 16.5 mm females. The ground colour of the forewings is pale ferruginous, but darker towards the wing base. The hindwings are whitish grey, tinged with pale ferruginous at the apex.

Etymology
The species name refers to the collecting locality, Sachatamia near Mindo.

References

Moths described in 2005
Euliini
Moths of South America
Taxa named by Józef Razowski